The United States Congress has operated with more than 1500 standing, special, select, or joint committees over the years.

Most of these committees are now defunct. In some cases, their responsibilities were merged with those of other committees. For others, the committee remained in existence, but its name was changed. However, the bulk of committees were eliminated because they served a single purpose or it was deemed that subject matter no longer merited its own committee.

These lists contain both select and standing committees. When known, the committee's type, years, reason for elimination, and any successor committees are noted. Some committees, such as the myriad "Committee(s) to Investigate," are included in the list alphabetically by the primary subject matter being studied or investigated.

Early select committees were very fluid, serving their established function and then going out of existence. This makes tracking committees difficult, since many committees were known by the date they were created or by a petition or other document that had been referred to them. In a number of instances, the official journal and other congressional publications did not consistently refer to an individual committee by the same title. Though such inconsistencies still appeared during the 20th century, they were less frequent. Therefore, this list does include hundreds of select committees established by Congress during its early years, particularly prior to 1795 and 1816, when a system of permanent standing committees was established in the House of Representatives and the Senate respectively. The majority of these committees were assigned specific legislative bills, but many served merely ceremonial functions.

In the 1st Congress (1789–1791), the House appointed about 220 select committees over the course of two years. By the 3rd Congress (1793–1795), Congress had three permanent standing committees, the House Committee on Elections, the House Committee on Claims, and the Joint Committee on Enrolled Bills, but more than 350 select committees. While the modern committee system is now firmly established in both House and Senate procedure, with the rules of each House establishing a full range of permanent standing committees and assigning jurisdiction of all legislative issues among them, select committees continue to be used to respond to unique and difficult issues as the need arises.

Defunct House committees

Defunct Senate committees

Defunct joint committees

References

Further reading
 
 
 
 
  , United States Senate Historical Office. November 2006.
 Via National Archives and Records Administration:
 Committee Resource Guide: Committees of the U.S. Senate
 Guide to the Records of the U.S. Senate at the National Archives (Record Group 46)
 Guide to the Records of the U.S. House of Representatives at the National Archives, 1789-1989 (Record Group 233)
 Chapter 23. Records of the Joint Committees of Congress 1789-1968 (Record Group 128)
 Current Committees in the House of Representatives
 Current Committees in the United States Senate
 Standing Committees of Congress: 1789 to Present

 
 
 
United States congressional committees